Eye of the Storm may refer to:

 Eye (cyclone), a region of calmer weather found at the center of strong tropical cyclones

Film
 The Eye of the Storm (1970 film), an American documentary by William Peters about Jane Elliott's classroom exercise "Blue eyes-Brown eyes"
 Eye of the Storm (1991 film), a German film directed by Yuri Zeltser
 Eye of the Storm, a 1992 film starring Jeff Conaway
 Eye of the Storm (2002 film), a surfing documentary by Joel Conroy
 The Eye of the Storm (2009 film), a Brazilian drama directed by Eduardo Valente
 The Eye of the Storm (2011 film), an Australian drama directed by Fred Schepisi
 Eye of the Storm (2015 film), a Burkinabé drama directed by Sékou Traoré

Literature and art
 The Eye of the Storm (novel), a 1973 novel by Patrick White
 Eye of the Storm (Ringo novel), a 2009 novel by John Ringo
 Eye of the Storm, a 1992 Sean Dillon novel by Jack Higgins
 Eye of the Storm, a 2000 exhibition and book featuring the US Civil War drawings of Robert Knox Sneden
 The Eye of the Storm: The View from the Centre of the Political Scandal, a 2014 book by Rob Wilson

Music

Albums
 Eye of the Storm (Albannach album), 2007
 Eye of the Storm (Divinefire album), 2011
 Eye of the Storm (Mahogany Rush album), or the title song, 2000
 Eye of the Storm (Mark Heard album), or the title song, 1983
 Eye of the Storm (One Ok Rock album), or the title song, 2019
 Eye of the Storm (Stormwitch album), or the title song, 1989
 Eye of the Storm (EP), by Insane Clown Posse, 2007

Songs
 "Eye of the Storm" (song), by Ryan Stevenson, 2016
 "Eye of the Storm", by Blindside from About a Burning Fire
 "Eye of the Storm", by Bliss n Eso from Flying Colours
 "Eye of the Storm", by Bullet for My Valentine from Scream Aim Fire
 "Eye of the Storm", by Bush from Man on the Run
 "Eye of the Storm", by Godsmack from When Legends Rise
 "Eye of the Storm", by The Haunted from Exit Wounds
 "Eye of the Storm", by Killswitch Engage from As Daylight Dies
 "Eye of the Storm", by Leprous from Aeolia
 "Eye of the Storm", by Pretty Maids from Future World
 "Eye of the Storm", by Sarah McTernan
 "Eye of the Storm", by Sergey Lazarev from Don't Be Fake
 "Eye of the Storm", by Pseudo Echo from Race
 "Eye of the Storm", by Scorpions from Return to Forever

Television
 Eye of the Storm (TV series), a British fantasy children's television serial by Childsplay Productions and ITV Meridian
 "Eye of the Storm" (Outlander), an episode
 "Eye of the Storm" (Sliders), an episode
 "Eye of the Storm" (Yu-Gi-Oh! Capsule Monsters), an episode

Video games
 Eye of the Storm (video game), a 1993 DOS game
 Eye of the Storm, an Amiga game

See also
 Eyes of the Storm, a 1994 comic book in the series Bone
 "I of the Storm", a song by Of Monsters and Men
 The Eye of Every Storm, a 2004 album by Neurosis
 In the Eye of the Storm (disambiguation)
 Eye of the Hurricane (disambiguation)